Daria Roithmayr is the George T. and Harriet E. Pfleger Professor of Law at the University of Southern California. She is a leading scholar on the subject of racial inequality.

Education
Roithmayr graduated from University of California, Los Angeles, and from the Georgetown University Law Center, magna cum laude. She clerked for Judge Marvin J. Garbis, of the U.S. District Court for the District of Maryland.

Career
Roithmayr joined the faculty at USC Gould School of Law in the fall of 2006. Prior to that, she taught for nine years at the University of Illinois College of Law. She has been a visiting professor at the University of Michigan, University of Chicago, Georgetown, and Yale. 
She has also been a guest researcher at Harvard's Program for Evolutionary Dynamics. Her book, Reproducing Racism: How Everyday Choices Lock In White Advantage was published by New York University Press in 2014. That book argues that racial inequality is perpetuated through a self-reinforcing monopoly of white advantage that is reproduced over time, even without intentional discrimination.

Selected writings

Barriers to Entry: A Market Lock-In Model of Discrimination, 86 "Virginia Law Review" 727-799 (2000)

References

External links

Official website
http://weblaw.usc.edu/news/article.cfm?newsID=132

University of California, Los Angeles alumni
Georgetown University Law Center alumni
University of Southern California faculty
Living people
Year of birth missing (living people)